Jesse Alright Shipp Jr. (June 11, 1881 – June 27, 1922) was an American Negro league catcher in the 1910s.

A native of Cincinnati, Ohio, Shipp played for the Brooklyn Royal Giants in 1910 and again in 1912. He died in New York, New York in 1922 at age 41.

References

External links
Baseball statistics and player information from Baseball-Reference Black Baseball Stats and Seamheads

1881 births
1922 deaths
Brooklyn Royal Giants players
Baseball catchers
Baseball players from Cincinnati
20th-century African-American people